Becoming Redwood is a 2012 Canadian film written and directed by Jesse James Miller, and starring Ryan Grantham, Jennifer Copping, and Chad Willett. In the film, 11-year-old Redwood (Grantham) believes he can bring his parents back together by beating Jack Nicklaus at the 1975 Masters golf tournament.

Robert Bell suggests that the film has "constant nods to Wes Anderson."

Accolades
Becoming Redwood won Most Popular Canadian Film at the 2012 Vancouver International Film Festival, and was nominated for the 2012 Vancouver Film Critics Circle Award for Best British Columbia Film.

References

External links

2012 films
2012 drama films
Canadian sports drama films
Golf films